Dicrosema is a genus of skippers in the family Hesperiidae.

Species  
 Dicrosema quadrifenestrata Bryk, 1953 (Anisochoria quadrifenestrata), eastern Brazil

References
Natural History Museum Lepidoptera genus database

Hesperiidae
Hesperiidae genera